The sleek lates (Lates stappersi) is a species of lates perch endemic to Lake Tanganyika. It is locally known as Mikebuka (Tanzania) or Mukeke (Democratic Republic of the Congo). This species can reach a length of  SL.  It is very important to local commercial fisheries.

References

Lates
Taxonomy articles created by Polbot